Jean Pierre François Bonet, Count of Bonet (born 8 August 1768 in Alençon; † 23 November 1857 Alençon) was a French military commander during the French Revolutionary Wars and Napoleonic Wars.

During the Peninsular War, both he and his commanding officer, Marshal Marmont, were wounded by shrapnel at the Battle of Salamanca.

His is among the names of French military leaders inscribed under the Arc de Triomphe.

References
 Pope, Stephen (1999). The Cassel Dictionary of the Napoleonic Wars. Cassel. .
 Schneid, Frederick C. (2011). The French Revolutionary and Napoleonic Wars. Mainz: Institute of European History.
 Gates, David (1986). The Spanish Ulcer: A History of the Peninsular War. Pimlico 2002. 

1768 births
1857 deaths
French military personnel of the French Revolutionary Wars
French generals
French commanders of the Napoleonic Wars
Military personnel from Alençon
Counts of France
Names inscribed under the Arc de Triomphe